Leonid is a tiny crater on the Moon. It is near the site where Soviet lunar rover Lunokhod 1 landed in November 1970, in the Mare Imbrium region. Its diameter is 0.12 km. The name Leonid does not refer to a specific person; it is a Russian male name of Greek origin.

References

External links

Leonid at The Moon Wiki
 
 

Impact craters on the Moon
Mare Imbrium